Charles Tessier (ca. 1550 – after 1604) was a French composer and lutenist. While in London he set sonnets from Astrophel and Stella dedicated to Lady Penelope Rich.

Works, editions and recordings
chansons and airs de cour in French, Italian and Gascon language for 4 and 5 voices, London 1597.
Airs 3 Paris 1604.

References

1550s births
17th-century deaths
17th-century classical composers
French Baroque composers
French classical composers
French male classical composers
French lutenists
17th-century male musicians